Order of the Holy Macedonian Cross is a Table Medal awarded by the Macedonian Orthodox Church - Ohrid Archbishopric.

Award Recipients

External links
Official website

Awards established in 2008
Macedonian awards
Macedonian Orthodox Church